A fifth-order Korteweg–De Vries (KdV) equation is a nonlinear partial differential equation in 1+1 dimensions related to the Korteweg–De Vries equation. Fifth order KdV equations may be used to model dispersive phenomena such as plasma waves when the third-order contributions are small. The term may refer to equations of the form

 

Unlike the KdV system, it is not integrable. It admits a great variety of soliton solutions.

References

Nonlinear partial differential equations